Veronica spicata (spiked speedwell; syn. Pseudolysimachion spicatum) is a species of flowering plant in the family Plantaginaceae.

It is the county flower of Montgomeryshire in the United Kingdom. Cultivated varieties include blue ('Royal Candles'), red ('Red Fox') and white ('Noah Williams').

It became a protected species in the UK in 1975 under the Conservation of Wild Creatures and Wild Plants Act.

References

External links
 

Plants described in 1753
Taxa named by Carl Linnaeus
spicata